"Everytime I Think About Her" is a song by American R&B singer Jaheim, features additional vocals from rapper Jadakiss. Produced by Bink, it was recorded for his third studio album Ghetto Classics (2005). The song contains a sample from "The Sly, Slick, and Wicked" by the Lost Generation and "I Choose You" by Willie Hutch.

Charts

References 

2006 singles
Jaheim songs
2006 songs
Songs written by Bink (record producer)
Songs written by Jadakiss